Hare Creek is a small stream in Mendocino County, California, just south of Fort Bragg. Its watershed is bordered on the north by the Noyo River, and on the south by Digger Creek. It is a significant habitat for coho salmon. It meets the Pacific Ocean at Hare Creek Beach, also known as Babcock Beach, owned and operated by the Mendocino Land Trust.

A railway line, the Caspar & Hare Creek Railroad, once carried logs  from Hare Creek to a sawmill on Jug Handle Creek.

The Hare Creek Bridge, also known as the Sergeant Emil H. Evensen Memorial Bridge, is traversed by California State Route 1 where it crosses the creek, just south of its junction with the terminus of California State Route 20. Like the Frederick W. Panhorst Bridge and the Jug Handle Bridge several miles to the south, it is a reinforced concrete open-spandrel deck arch bridge, but differs from them in having two partial side arches. It was originally built in 1947. In 2007, its substructure was rated as in good condition, but its deck was classified as "poor". A Caltrans project, planned to begin in 2025, is set to widen the bridge, upgrade its rails, and retrofit it for seismic safety standards.

References

Rivers of Mendocino County, California